Ranavav railway station  is a railway station serving in Porbandar district of Gujarat State of India. It is under Bhavnagar railway division of Western Railway Zone of Indian Railways. Passenger, Express trains halt here.

Major trains 

Following major trains halt at Ranavav railway station in both direction:

 19015/16 Porbandar - Mumbai Central Saurashtra Express
 19571/72 Rajkot - Porbandar Express (Via Jetalsar)

References

Railway stations in Porbandar district
Bhavnagar railway division